The 2021 President of the Federal Senate of Brazil election took place on 1 February 2021, during the opening day of the 3rd Session of the 56th Legislature of the National Congress.

Incumbent President Davi Alcolumbre can't run for re-election due to term limits.

Senator Rodrigo Pacheco (DEM-MG) won Senator Simone Tebet (MDB-MS) with 57 votes.

Candidates

Confirmed candidates
 Rodrigo Pacheco (DEM-MG) - Senator for Minas Gerais since 2019; Federal Deputy from Minas Gerais 2015−19.
 Simone Tebet (MDB-MS) - Senator for Mato Grosso do Sul since 2015; State Secretary of Government of Mato Grosso do Sul 2013–14; Vice Governor of Mato Grosso do Sul 2011–15; Mayor of Três Lagoas 2005–10; State Deputy of Mato Grosso do Sul 2003–05.

Declined candidates
 Alvaro Dias (PODE-PR) - Senator for Paraná since 1999, 1983–87; Governor of Paraná 1987–91; Federal Deputy from Paraná 1975–83; State Deputy of Paraná 1971–75; City Councillor of Londrina 1969–71.
 Antonio Anastasia (PSD-MG) - Senator for Minas Gerais since 2015; 1st Vice President of the Federal Senate since 2019; Governor of Minas Gerais 2011–14; Vice Governor of Minas Gerais 2007–10; Acting Minister of Labour 1998.

Lost in convention
 Eduardo Braga (MDB-AM) - Senator for Amazonas since 2011; Minister of Mines and Energy 2015–16; Governor of Amazonas 2003–10; Mayor of Manaus 1994–97; Vice Mayor of Manaus 1993–97; Federal Deputy from Amazonas 1991–93; State Deputy of Amazonas 1987–91.
 Eduardo Gomes (MDB-TO) - Senator for Tocantins since 2019; State Secretary of Governorship of Tocantins 2019; Federal Deputy from Tocantins 2003–15; City Councillor of Palmas 1997–2003.
 Fernando Bezerra Coelho (MDB-PE) - Senator for Pernambuco since 2015; Minister of National Integration 2011–13; Mayor of Petrolina 2001–06, 1993–97; Federal Deputy from Pernambuco 1987–92; State Deputy of Pernambuco 1983–87.
 Jorge Kajuru (CDN-GO) - Senator for Goiás since 2019; City Councillor of Goiânia 2017–19.
 Lasier Martins (PODE-RS) - Senator for Rio Grande do Sul since 2015; 2nd Vice President of the Federal Senate since 2019.
 Sérgio Olímpio (PSL-SP) - Senator for São Paulo since 2019; Federal Deputy from São Paulo 2015–19; State Deputy of São Paulo 2007–15.

Endorsements

Predictions

Formal voting

References

Elections in Brazil 
2021 elections in Brazil 

President of the Federal Senate of Brazil elections